Bert Doorn (born 26 May 1949) is a Dutch politician and Member of the European Parliament (MEP). He is a member of the Christian Democratic Appeal, which is part of the European People's Party, and sits on the European Parliament's Committee on Legal Affairs and its Committee on the Internal Market and Consumer Protection.

He is also a member of the delegation for relations with the countries of Southeast Asia and the Association of Southeast Asian Nations, and a substitute for the delegation for relations with the Korean Peninsula.

Biography
Doorn was born in Enschede, Overijssel.  He studied law at Groningen (1968–1973), Nancy (1973–1974) and Freiburg (1974).  He obtained a doctorate in competition law from Freiburg (1976–1978)
He was Secretary for international affairs (1978–1992) and secretary for matters relating to company law (1992–1997) with the VNO (Confederation of Netherlands Industry).  From 1997 to 1999, he was a company lawyer with VNO-NCW (Confederation of Netherlands Industry and Employers) (1997–1999).  He was involved in various activities with the CDA, acting as Chairman of the Wassenaar section, a member of the national working party on international cooperation, and a member of the CDA's Foreign Affairs Committee.

He became a Member of the European Parliament in 1999, and represents the CDA, as a Member of the EPP Group in the European Parliament.  He has been delegation leader since 2003.

External links
 Official website
 European Parliament biography
 

1949 births
Living people
Christian Democratic Appeal MEPs
MEPs for the Netherlands 1999–2004
MEPs for the Netherlands 2004–2009
People from Enschede